Doratifera is a genus of cup-moth caterpillars in the family Limacodidae. The genus was erected by James Duncan in 1841. There are about 13 described species in Doratifera, found primarily in Australia. They are called cup-moths because of the shape of their cocoons. In the species Doratifera vulnerans, the venon has a complex structure having 151 different protein-based toxins produced from 59 distinct protein families. The venom can be used in pesticides and drugs.

Species
These 13 species belong to the genus Doratifera:

 Doratifera casta Scott, 1864
 Doratifera corallina Turner, 1902
 Doratifera nagodina Hering, 1931
 Doratifera ochroptila Turner, 1926
 Doratifera olorina Turner, 1926
 Doratifera oxleyi Newman, 1855
 Doratifera pinguis Walker, 1855
 Doratifera quadriguttata Walker, 1855
 Doratifera rufa Bethune-Baker, 1904
 Doratifera stenora Turner, 1902
 Doratifera trigona Turner, 1942
 Doratifera unicolora Swinhoe, 1902
 Doratifera vulnerans Lewin, 1805

References

External links

 

Limacodidae